Prince Igor Constantinovich of Russia (Игорь Константинович; 10 June 1894 – 18 July 1918) was the sixth child of Grand Duke Constantine Constantinovich of Russia by his wife Elisaveta Mavrikievna née Princess Elisabeth of Saxe-Altenburg.

Biography
Igor was born on June 10, 1894 and attended the Corps des Pages, an imperial military academy in Saint Petersburg. He enjoyed theatre.

During World War I, he was a cornet in the His Majesty's Hussar Guards Regiment and became a decorated war hero. However, his health was quite fragile: he suffered from pleurisy and lung complications in 1915, and even if he returned to the trenches, he couldn't walk quickly and often coughed and spat blood.

On 4 April 1918, he was exiled to the Urals by the Bolsheviks and murdered in July the same year in a mineshaft  near the town of Alapaevsk, along with his brothers Prince John Constantinovich and Prince Constantine Constantinovich, his cousin Prince Vladimir Pavlovich Paley and other relatives and friends. His body was eventually buried in the Russian Orthodox Church cemetery in Beijing, which was destroyed in 1986 and is now a parking lot.

See also 
 Romanov sainthood

Ancestors

References

1894 births
1918 deaths
Murdered Russian royalty
Princes of royal blood (Russia)
Russian military personnel of World War I
Victims of Red Terror in Soviet Russia
Executed people from Saint Petersburg
19th-century people from the Russian Empire
Eastern Orthodox royal saints
Executed royalty
Burials in Beijing